Louis De Lannoy (16 June 1902, in Antwerp – 7 February 1968, in Antwerp) was a Belgian professional road bicycle racer. In 1929 he won stage 4 of the Tour de France

Major results

1929
Tour de France:
Winner stage 4
6th place overall classification
1926
3rd in Scheldeprijs Vlaanderen
1927
2nd in Stage 4 Tour Of Belgium
1928
2nd in Tour Of Belgium
3rd in Tour Of Flanders
3 in Wilrijk
1929
1st in Circuit De Champagne
3rd in National Championship Cyclo-Cross Elite Belgium
1930
3rd in National Closing Price
1931
2nd in Tour Of Belgium
3rd in Boom

External links 

Official Tour de France results for Louis De Lannoy

Belgian male cyclists
1902 births
1968 deaths
Belgian Tour de France stage winners
Cyclists from Antwerp